The 1990 Wisconsin Badgers football team represented the University of Wisconsin–Madison during the 1990 NCAA Division I-A football season. They were led by first year head coach Barry Alvarez and participated as members of the Big Ten Conference. The Badgers played their home games at Camp Randall Stadium in Madison, Wisconsin.

Schedule

Personnel

1991 NFL Draft

References

Wisconsin
Wisconsin Badgers football seasons
Wisconsin Badgers football